Eugen Niederer (22 August 1881 – 28 January 1957) was a Swiss painter. His work was part of the painting event in the art competition at the 1936 Summer Olympics.

References

1881 births
1957 deaths
20th-century Swiss painters
Swiss male painters
Olympic competitors in art competitions
Artists from Stuttgart
20th-century Swiss male artists
German emigrants to Switzerland